The 1987–88 Santosh Trophy was the 41st edition of the Santosh Trophy, the main State competition for football in India. It was held in Kollam, Kerala. Punjab defeated Kerala 5–4 in sudden death in the final to win the competition for the sixth time.

Preliminary round 
 Group 1 

 

 Group 2 

 

 Group 3 

 

 
      
 Group 4 

 

 Group 5 

 Group 6

Final round 
Santhosh trophy season 1986-87 semi finalist got direct entry to the final round .  Bengal, Bihar, Kerala, Railways are the semifinalists 1986-87.

 Group A 
<onlyinclude>

 Group B 
<onlyinclude>

Semifinals

Final

References

External links 
 Santosh Trophy 1988 at Rec.Sport.Soccer Statistics Foundation

Santosh Trophy seasons
1987–88 in Indian football